Rhantus taprobanicus, is a species of predaceous diving beetle found in India, Nepal, Pakistan and Sri Lanka.

Description
Reticulation of ventral side not distinct. Elytra with more spaced normal striae of punctures. Anterior claws are thinner. Suture between metapisternum and metasternal wing is curved. The apical spurs of hind tibiae are blunt and more or less bifid.

References 

Dytiscidae
Insects of Sri Lanka
Insects described in 1890